Betsy Jones-Moreland (died May 1, 2006) was an American actress.

Early life
Jones-Moreland worked in secretarial jobs before she became an entertainer.

Career
Jones-Moreland acted on stage, including as a member of the newly formed Valley Playhouse in Woodland Hills, California, in 1958 and the Players Ring Theater in Los Angeles in 1960. She also appeared in The Solid Gold Cadillac on Broadway and in the touring company that presented that play across the United States.

She began her film career in small roles in the mid-1950s, appearing in several Roger Corman films, including a lead role in Last Woman on Earth (1960). Subsequently, she appeared mostly on television through 1975.

Jones-Moreland guest-starred in an episode of the television series Ironside starring Raymond Burr, and in the early 1990s appeared in a recurring role as a judge in a series of his Perry Mason television films. Her first Perry Mason appearance was in 1959 as Lorrie Garvin in "The Case of the Dubious Bridegroom." In Have Gun - Will Travel, Jones-Moreland guest-starred as Topaz, a saloon hostess who befriended Paladin in the episode "Brother's Keeper" that aired May 6, 1961. In 1962, she appeared as Nurse Brown on McHale's Navy.

Death
At age 76, the actress died from cancer in El Monte, California.

Filmography

Television

References

External links

 

2006 deaths
Actresses from New York City
American film actresses
American television actresses
People from Brooklyn
Deaths from cancer in California
20th-century American actresses
1930 births
21st-century American women